James Horst Brunnerman Bell (Dr J. H. B. Bell) (1896–1975) was arguably the leading Scots mountaineer in the period prior to World War II, going on to edit the SMC Journal for an unequalled 24 years from 1936 to 1959. He put up many serious routes on Ben Nevis and around, and tutored among others the younger W. H. Murray. His "Scottish Climb" is still well regarded. One of his first "ascents" was "Long Climb" (Bell & J. D. B. Wilson, June 1940), a 1400-ft Severe on the Orion Face of Ben Nevis - it is reputedly the longest in the UK.

Bell trained as an industrial chemist (DSc, Edinburgh, 1932), and so (according to Murray) regarded food only as "fuel", mixing many courses together when preparing for a day on the hill.

Bell was always keen to train others, and did several of his new routes with women climbers, including his wife Pat. He published A Progress in Mountaineering in 1950.

Bell also revised the guidebook for the Island of Skye (originally produced by Steeple, Barlow & MacRobert in 1931) in 1954.

References

Bell, J. H. B. Bell (1950), A Progress in Mountaineering, Oliver & Boyd
Brown, Hamish (editor) Bell's Scottish Climbs, Gollanz - an edited version of Bell's work.
The Long Climb is described by Malcolm Slesser in Classic Rock:
Wilson, K, (1978), Classic Rock, Granada
The Island of Skye by E.W. Steeple, G. Barlow & G. MacRobert & J.H.B. Bell. 1954 3rd edition

Scottish mountain climbers
1896 births
1975 deaths
Scottish chemists
Alumni of the University of Edinburgh
Scottish educators
Scottish non-fiction writers
20th-century Scottish educators
20th-century Scottish writers